James Sayegh is an American television soap opera director.

Directing Credits

One Life to Live
 Associate Director (1988–1995)
 Director (1996–1998)

Passions
 Director (entire run, 1999–2008)

The Young and the Restless
 Occasional Director (2008)

Awards and nominations
Daytime Emmy Award
Nomination, 2001, 2003–2004, Directing, Passions
Nomination, 1988–1989, 1995, Directing, One Life to Live

Directors Guild of America Award
Win, 1998, Directing, One Life to Live, (episode #7572)
Nomination, 1993, Directing, One Life to Live, (episode #6356)

External links

American television directors
Year of birth missing (living people)
Living people